KCEC (channel 14) is a television station licensed to Boulder, Colorado, United States, broadcasting the Spanish-language Univision network to the Denver area. Owned by TelevisaUnivision, it is operated under a local marketing agreement (LMA) by Entravision Communications as a sister station to UniMás affiliate KTFD-TV (channel 50). Both stations share studios on Mile High Stadium West Circle in Jefferson Park, Denver, while KCEC's transmitter is located atop Mount Morrison in western Jefferson County.

KVSN-DT (channel 48) in Pueblo operates as a semi-satellite of KCEC, expanding the Univision signal into South-Central Colorado. As such, it simulcasts all Univision programming as provided through its parent, and the two stations share a website. However, KVSN airs separate commercial inserts and legal identifications. Local newscasts, produced by KCEC and branded as Noticias Univision Colorado, are simulcast on both stations. KVSN does not maintain any facilities in Pueblo or Colorado Springs; master control and internal operations are based at KCEC's studios.

History
The history of Univision in Colorado begins with the installation of the second "satellator"—satellite-fed Broadcast relay station#translator—for the then-Spanish International Network, which began broadcasting on channel 31 in 1982. It moved to channel 49 after full-power station KDVR was built on that channel, and in 1989, local operations began out of a small facility in Lakewood. The local translator had the call sign K49CE, and the station called itself "KCEC". Between 1989 and 1990, the local operation, owned by Lomas de Oro Broadcasting Corporation, expanded from five personnel to 20.

Simultaneously, in 1986, Lomas de Oro had applied for a construction permit for channel 50 in Denver. This was granted on November 1, 1989, and on July 8, 1991, the low-power channel 49 was replaced with a new KCEC (previously KSHP) on channel 50, a power boost that brought the station into 30,000 more households and led to a doubling of the number of viewers watching Spanish-language TV in the Denver area.

Entravision Communications purchased KCEC in 1997 from the Golden Hills Broadcasting Corporation, successor to Lomas de Oro, as part of a merger of Entravision founder Walter Ulloa's broadcast interests into one company. Entravision moved its studios from Lakewood to a facility on Grant Street at the end of 1999; it relocated again in 2012 to its present studio facility located near Sports Authority Field (now Empower Field at Mile High), which houses the company's 60 employees.

In 2009, the station debuted a locally produced telenovela titled Encrucijada: Sin Salud, no hay Nada (translated as Crossroads: Without Health, There is Nothing), in conjunction with the Colorado Health Foundation, that focused on the ongoing obesity crisis in the United States in order to educate Coloradoans on healthier eating habits; a second season of the series was ordered and broadcast in 2011.

On December 4, 2017, as part of a channel swap made by Entravision Communications, KCEC and sister station KTFD swapped channel numbers, with KCEC moving from digital channel 26 and virtual channel 50 to digital channel 15 and virtual channel 14.

On April 29, 2020, KCEC moved to digital channel 32 as part of the FCC repack.

News operation
By 1993, KCEC was airing locally produced two-minute newsbriefs three times a day. This grew into a full-length 30-minute early evening newscast on January 30, 1995, with the program originally anchored by news director Rodolfo Cárdenas (who had defected from KUBD (channel 59), the Telemundo affiliate) and Luis Canela. A live 10 p.m. newscast debuted in 2001.

In 1997, an anonymous tip faxed to the station led to it breaking news of an impending raid by the U.S. Immigration and Naturalization Service, which canceled the sting operation as a result. Yrma Rico, who served as KCEC's general manager, told The Denver Post, "We don't want to lose our viewers."

While the station's ratings steadily rose to become competitive with those of the market's English-language stations among adults 18–34 and 18–49 by 2010, Telemundo station KDEN-TV has increased its ratings over the course of the 2010s.

Technical information

Subchannels
The station's digital signal is multiplexed:

Analog-to-digital conversion
KCEC shut down its analog signal, over UHF channel 50, on June 12, 2009, the official date in which full-power television stations in the United States transitioned from analog to digital broadcasts under federal mandate. The station's digital signal remained on its pre-transition UHF channel 51. The station was licensed to move its digital signal to channel 26 on May 20, 2015. Through the use of PSIP, digital television receivers display the station's virtual channel as its former UHF analog channel 50.

References

External links

Television channels and stations established in 1990
CEC (TV)
CEC (TV)
1990 establishments in Colorado
Entravision Communications stations
Univision network affiliates
Bounce TV affiliates
GetTV affiliates
Ion Mystery affiliates